Samuel McKuen Smead (June 11, 1830April 28, 1898) was an American newspaper editor and politician.

Born in Troy, Pennsylvania, Smead moved to Wisconsin Territory in 1846 and settled in Fond du Lac County. In 1853, Smead became the publisher of the newspaper the Fond du Lac Press. He was also in the mercantile and real estate business. President Andrew Johnson appointed Smead assessor of internal revenue. President Grover Cleveland also appointed Smead postmaster for Fond du Lac, Wisconsin. In 1893, Smead was elected to the Wisconsin State Senate and was a Democrat. Soon after the murder of his son Fred B. Smead (1863–1895) in Chicago, Smead resigned from his position as senator and was replaced by Lyman Wellington Thayer. Smead died at his home in Fond du Lac, Wisconsin.

Notes

External links

1830 births
1898 deaths
People from Bradford County, Pennsylvania
Politicians from Fond du Lac, Wisconsin
Businesspeople from Wisconsin
Editors of Wisconsin newspapers
Democratic Party Wisconsin state senators
Wisconsin postmasters
19th-century American politicians
Journalists from Pennsylvania
19th-century American businesspeople